A Winter Book is a collection of twenty short stories by Finnish author Tove Jansson, published by Sort of Books in 2006. The stories, some of which had not previously been published in English, were selected by Ali Smith, who also wrote the book's introduction and had previously reviewed The Summer Book for The Guardian. Thirteen of them are from Jansson's first book for adults, Sculptor's Daughter (1968), and the remaining seven are from four of her other works. Five were included in her 1998 Swedish language collection Messages (Meddelande), including the title piece, a partially fictionalised compilation of letters Jansson had received. They were translated into English from the original Swedish by Silvester Mazzarella, David McDuff and Kingsley Hart. 

In a review for The Guardian, Josh Lacey described it as a "short, brittle book" and "an oddly satisfying jumble" featuring several of Jansson's recurring tropes: "strange creatures with surprising powers, islands and small boats and the sea, loneliness and introspection, the vital influence of art and the imagination". Sean Michaels for The Skinny said it was "in large part exceptional".  Philip Pullman described the stories as "tough as old rope" in the afterword he wrote for the book.

Stories in A Winter Book include "Squirrel", in which a woman's isolated life on an island is shared for a time with a squirrel, and the last story, "Taking Leave", in which two women realise that they have become too frail to spend their summers on the island they love.

Contents
A Winter Book is arranged in three sections, "Snow", "Flotsam and Jetsam" and "Travelling Light".

Introduction by Ali Smith

Snow
 "The Stone" (from Sculptor's Daughter (Bildhuggarens dotter))
 "Parties" (from Sculptor's Daughter)
 "The Dark" (from Sculptor's Daughter)
 "Snow" (from Sculptor's Daughter)
 "German Measles" (from Sculptor's Daughter)
 "Flying" (from Sculptor's Daughter)
 "Annie" (from Sculptor's Daughter)

Flotsam and Jetsam
 "The Iceberg" (from Sculptor's Daughter)
 "Albert" (from Sculptor's Daughter)
 "Flotsam and Jetsam" (from Sculptor's Daughter)
 "High Water" (from Sculptor's Daughter)
 Jeremiah  (from Sculptor's Daughter)
 "The Spinster Who Had an Idea" (from Sculptor's Daughter)
 "The Boat and Me" (from Messages (Meddelande))

Travelling Light

 "The Squirrel" (from The Listener (Lyssnerskan), included in Messages)
 "Letters from Klara" (from Letters from Klara (Brev från Klara), included in Messages)
 "Messages" (from Messages)
 "Correspondence" (from Travelling Light (Resa med lätt bagage))
 "Travelling Light" (from Travelling Light, included in Messages)
 "Taking Leave" (extract from Notes from an Island (Anteckningar från en ö ))

Afterword by Philip Pullman

References

Further reading
 

1998 short story collections
Finnish short story collections